James Owen Perrine (February 26, 1886 – September 10, 1974) was an American physicist, college professor, developer of telephone technology, and coach of college football and college basketball.

Athletic career
Perrine was a 1909 graduate of the University of Iowa, where he lettered in football on the 1908 team.

Coaching career
Perrine served as the head football coach at the University of Northern Iowa–then known as Iowa State Teachers College–in Cedar Falls, Iowa in 1910 and 1917.

Academic and business career
Perrine earned a bachelor's degree from the University of Iowa, a master's degree from the University of Michigan, and a doctorate in physics from Cornell University. He was a professor at the University of Northern Iowa and also lectured on physics at Yale University and Montclair State University. From 1939 to 1951, he was an assistant vice president at AT&T, where he developed transatlantic telephone technology and the dial telephone.

Family and death
Perrine was born on February 26, 1886, in Bushnell, Illinois to Peter and Elizabeth Rockefeller Perrine. He married Blanch Albright on October 1, 1910 in Burlington, Iowa. Perrine died on September 10, 1974, at the Western Home in Cedar Falls, Iowa.

Head coaching record

Football

References

External links
 

1886 births
1974 deaths
AT&T people
Cornell University alumni
University of Michigan alumni
Iowa Hawkeyes football players
Northern Iowa Panthers football coaches
Northern Iowa Panthers men's basketball coaches
University of Northern Iowa faculty
People from Bushnell, Illinois
Players of American football from Illinois